The Men's 10 m platform competition of the 2014 European Aquatics Championships was held on 23 August.

Results
The preliminary round was held at 10:00 and the final round at 14:00.

Green denotes finalists

References

2014 European Aquatics Championships